Cherkalam Abdullah (15 September 1942 – 27 July 2018) was an Indian politician. He was Member of the Kerala Legislative Assembly from the Manjeshwar Assembly constituency since 1987 to 2006. He was associated with the Indian Union Muslim League.

Early life 
Abdullah was born to Barikad Muhammed Haji and Asyamma on September 15, 1942, at Cherkalam.

Personal life 
Abdullah was married to Ayesha Cherkalam. He they had 4 children together, 2 daughter and 2 son. His whole family is connected to politics.

References 

1942 births
2018 deaths
Indian Union Muslim League politicians
Kerala MLAs 1987–1991
Kerala MLAs 1991–1996
Kerala MLAs 1996–2001
Kerala MLAs 2001–2006
People from Kasaragod district